Jean-Paul-André des Razins, marquis de Saint-Marc, (29 November 1728 – 11 September 1818) was an 18th-century French playwright and librettist.

A former officer of the Gardes françaises, Saint-Marc wrote the libretto for Adèle de Ponthieu, a five-act tragedy set to music by Niccolò Piccinni. He composed several opéra comique librettos and numerous pieces of fugitive poetry.

In 1778, attending in Paris the famous presentation of Irène, after which the bust of Voltaire was crowned, the marquis de Saint-Marc improvised this quatrain which made him famous:

The mansion in the city where he lived and died was registered as Monument historique 23 July 1921.

Sources 
 Actes de l’Académie nationale des sciences, belles-lettres et arts de Bordeaux, Paris, E. Dentu, 1880, p. 39.

References

External links 
 Adèle de Ponthieu on Gallica
 Jean-Paul-André de Razins Saint-Marc on 
  Jean-Paul-André de Razins Saint-Marc on 
 His plays and their presentations on CÉSAR

18th-century French dramatists and playwrights
French opera librettists
1728 births
People from Nouvelle-Aquitaine
1818 deaths